Ana Filipa Capitão Lopes (born 14 September 1989), commonly known as Tita, is a Portuguese professional footballer who plays as a midfielder. She is a Portuguese international.

Honours
Benfica
 Campeonato Nacional II Divisão Feminino: 2018–19
 Taça de Portugal: 2018–19

References

External links
 
 

1989 births
Living people
Portuguese women's footballers
Portugal women's international footballers
Women's association football midfielders
Atlético Ouriense players
S.L. Benfica (women) footballers
Campeonato Nacional de Futebol Feminino players
Sportspeople from Leiria District